Feijoada is a stew of beans with beef and pork. The name feijoada comes from feijão, 'bean' in Portuguese. It is widely prepared in the Portuguese-speaking world, with slight variations.

The basic ingredients of feijoada are beans and fresh pork or beef. In Brazil, it is usually made with black beans. The stew is best prepared over low heat in a thick clay pot.
 
It is usually served with rice and assorted sausages  such as chouriço, morcela (blood sausage), farinheira, and others, which may or may not be cooked in the stew.

Brazilian feijoada

Many modern variants of the dish are based on feijoada recipes popularized in the Brazilian regions of Rio de Janeiro, São Paulo, Recife, and Salvador. In Brazil, feijoada is considered a national dish.

First documented in Recife, State of Pernambuco, feijoada has been described as a national dish of Brazil, especially of Rio de Janeiro, as other parts of Brazil have other regional dishes. The Brazilian version of feijoada (feijoada completa) is prepared with black beans, a variety of salted pork or beef products, such as pork trimmings (ears, tail, feet), bacon, smoked pork ribs, and at least two types of smoked sausage and jerked beef (loin and tongue). The final dish has the beans and meat pieces barely covered by a dark purplish-brown broth. The taste is strong, moderately salty but not spicy, dominated by black bean and meat stew flavors. It is customary to serve it with white rice and oranges, the latter to help with digestion, as well as couve, a side dish of stir-fried, chopped collard greens, and a crumbly topping called farofa, made of manioc flour.

As a celebratory dish, feijoada is traditionally served on Saturday afternoons or Sunday lunch and intended to be a leisurely midday meal. It is meant to be enjoyed throughout the day and not eaten under rushed circumstances. The meal is usually eaten among extended family and paired with an event like watching a football match or other social event. Because of the dish's heavy ingredients and rich flavors, feijoada is viewed as Brazilian soul food. In the city of São Paulo, feijoada is a typical dish in working-class restaurants on Wednesdays and Saturdays, mainly in the commercial area. In Rio de Janeiro, restaurants traditionally serve it on Fridays. The dish is normally served with a choice among a selection of meats, e.g. pork, bacon, pig ears, pig feet, to fulfill the customer's needs. Other variations of feijoada also exist, such as low fat or vegetarian versions.

Origins
Meat (pork) stew with vegetables can be traced to ancient Roman cuisine. The dish spread with the Roman Empire and gave rise to dishes such as the French cassoulet, the Milanese cassoeula, the Romanian fasole cu cârnați, the fabada asturiana from Northwestern Spain, the Spanish cocido madrileño and olla podrida, and the feijoada of Minho Province in Northern Portugal.

Black beans were domesticated by indigenous peoples in the Americas.
Cheap and easy to cultivate, they became a staple among European settlers in Brazil. Both the upper classes and the poor ate black beans, but the upper classes particularly enjoyed them with an assortment of meat and vegetables, similar to feijoada. In contrast, the poor and enslaved usually ate a mixture of black beans and manioc flour. 

The culinary historian Jessica B. Harris has compared Feijoada to American soul food. She has also linked the use of mixed meats, slow-cooking, and the accompaniment of collard greens to the traditions of enslaved African people.

Regional variations
The type of bean used in feijoada varies by region. While in the southeast, including Rio de Janeiro and Minas Gerais, feijoada is typically prepared with black beans, in Bahia, Sergipe and Goiás brown or red beans are more commonly used.

In most of Brazil, feijoada consists of only beans and meat, but in Bahia and Sergipe it is common to add vegetables including plantains, kale, potatoes, carrots, cabbage, and pumpkins, usually near the end of the cooking process, when they are cooked from beneath by the vapors of the stew.

In popular culture
In 1977, Chico Buarque released a song called "Feijoada Completa". The song's lyrics describe the ingredients, the method of preparation, and a typical way in which feijoada is consumed.

Feijoada was featured on the Netflix TV series Street Food volume 2, which focused on Latin American street foods.

In the fourth episode of Final Table, the episode revolved around Brazil. In the first round of the episode, the chefs were asked to prepare a Feijoada.

Feijoada is one of the foods that can be cooked by the player in the Hamlet downloadable content expansion pack for Don't Starve, which was released in 2019. It requires meat items and a fictional counterpart of jumping beans, and has the longest cooking time of any recipe in the game.

See also

 Cassoeula 
 Cassoulet
 Rice and beans
 Fabada asturiana
 Fasole cu cârnați
 List of Portuguese dishes
 List of Brazilian dishes
 List of stews

References

Portuguese stews
Brazilian stews
National dishes
Legume dishes
East Timorese cuisine
Angolan cuisine
São Tomé and Príncipe cuisine
Beef dishes
Pork dishes
Portuguese words and phrases